Eat App is a global restaurant reservation software company. It allows users to search and discover restaurants, and make reservations online. The company charges restaurants for the use of Restaurant Manager by Eat, a reservation and table management system, and a per diner fee for online reservations. According to the company, the system has seated over 6,500,000 guests to date.

Eat was founded by Nezar Kadhem and David Feuillard in 2015 and has raised $7,200,000 to date  from Silicon Valley's 500 startups, Middle East Venture Partners (MEVP), Derayah VC, amongst other business angels. The company is currently operational across the Middle East, with offices in Bahrain and Dubai.

Product overview
The service allows users to discover restaurants, search for available time slots and reserve a table online. The reservation is synced in real-time to Restaurant Manager by Eat, a  reservation system installed at the restaurant. After the reservation is complete, the user receives a confirmation email and SMS, and is able to share the reservation details with friends, update or cancel the reservation and book an Uber to the restaurant. Eat App offers restaurants a reservation system that replaces the traditional pen and paper method, to allow for a digital record of all reservations, all guests that have previously visited the restaurant, as well as analytics on the performance of the restaurant.

History & Investments 
In February 2015, Eat App raised $300k from Bahrain-based business angel group TENMOU.

In June 2018, Eat raised $1.2 million from Dubai-based Middle East Venture Partners (MEVP).

In February 2020, Eat App raised $5 million in a Series B funding round led by 500 Startups, Derayah Venture Fund, and MEVP, with participation from a few angel investors and family members.

References

External links
 

Mobile applications
Restaurant guides
2015 establishments in Bahrain